HD 210702 is an orange subgiant star  located approximately 177 light-years away in the constellation of Pegasus. With a mass of 1.8 times that of the Sun, the star spent its main-sequence life as an A-type star. The visual luminosity is 11.38 times that of the Sun and the magnitude is near the naked-eye limit, but binoculars can easily see it.

Planetary system
The star shows variability in its radial velocity consistent with a planet-mass companion in a Keplerian orbit, and one was duly discovered in April 2007, from observations at Lick and Keck Observatories in Mount Hamilton (California) and Mauna Kea (Hawai'i), United States.

See also
 HD 175541
 HD 192699
 List of extrasolar planets

References

 

K-type subgiants
210702
109577
Pegasus (constellation)
Planetary systems with one confirmed planet
Durchmusterung objects
8461